The Honduran Football Reserve League is the reserve league for the Honduran Liga Nacional.  It was developed in 2005 and it is made up of players from 15 to 20 years old.  Club Deportivo Olimpia won the first tournament in 2005–06 (Apertura).

Winners

Titles by club

References

Reserves
Reserves
Honduras